South Hill is a planned and approved CTrain light rail station in Calgary, Alberta, Canada part of the Green Line. Construction will begin in 2022 and complete in 2027 as part of construction stage one, segment one. The station is located in the north-western corner of Shepard Industrial, directly nearby Glenmore Trail and the suburban residential community of Riverbend.    

South Hill station will feature a transit plaza, and will become the centrepiece of new mixed-use transit oriented development village. Much of the South Hill area is city-owned, which provides a unique opportunity for development on almost 20 acres of largely vacant land, though a factory and several mobile homes are currently set up in the area. Additionally, the station will be a major transit hub with connections to neighbouring residential and commercial communities. Utility relocation, land preparation and environmental redemption work have been underway since 2017.

References 

CTrain stations
Railway stations scheduled to open in 2027